Loosli is a Swiss German surname. Notable people with the surname include:

 David Loosli (born 1980), Swiss cyclist
 Hans Loosli, Swiss footballer
 Noah Loosli (born 1997), Swiss footballer
 Walter Loosli (1932–2015), Swiss sculptor and artist

German-language surnames